Samuel Roker (born 21 February 1953) is a Haitian painter.  Born in Cap-Haïtien, Roker studied at a branch of the Academie des Beaux Arts in Port-au-Prince (1971–73) and at the Mayer School of Fashion Design in New York (1989–90).

Career
In 1984, he won first prize from the Ocean Parkway Community Development Corporation in Brooklyn, NY, and the following year won first prize from All Community Arts in Brooklyn.  He has had solo exhibitions at the Galleria Et Encadrement 25 in Paris (1988), the Afro American Center in Charlotte, NC (1991), and at the Roker Art Gallery in Miami, FL (2000, 2001, 2002).  His work has been included in numerous group exhibitions, including ones in Port-au-Prince, Miami, New York, Germany, Puerto Rico, and Key West. Much of his early work was inspired by the natural landscape and culture of Haiti, though he has also explored a more modern abstract style.

External links 
Franciscus, John Allen (1931- ), Haiti : Voodoo Kingdom to Modern Riviera, Condado, San Juan, P.R. : Franciscus Family Foundation, c1980.
Pataki, Eva (1954- ), Haitian painting : Art and Kitsch, Jamaica Estates, N.Y. : E. Pataki, c1986.

References

1953 births
Haitian painters
Haitian male painters
Living people
People from Cap-Haïtien
Haitian emigrants to the United States